Chhatargarh is a tehsil in the Bikaner district of Rajasthan, India. Most of the area is covered by agricultural land.

It is a subdivision and situated approximately 85 km away from district headquarter Bikaner.  It comes under Khajuwala assembly and Bikaner parliamentary constituency.

The postal Code is 334021.

References

Tehsils of Rajasthan